Xinkai (officially Xinkai Auto Manufacture Corporation) is a Chinese car manufacturer headquartered in Gaobeidian.

Operations
The company includes the head office in Gaobeidian, a production and assembly line in Zhuozhou, an auto parts manufacturing facility in Qinghe, and an assembly line in Tai'an.

The Toyota Camry (XV10) was rebadged as the Xinkai HXK6630, where finding a joint venture was difficult in the 1990s. then in 2004, Xinkai entered into an agreement with Mercedes-Benz to assemble the Mercedes-Benz Commercial Vehicle for the Chinese market. Xinkai's original trucks are also exported, mainly to Africa and to Latin America. The Xinkai HXK1021 EB pickup truck is sold in Chile as the Autorrad Ruda. With a capacity of 200,000 vehicles per year, the production of 33,000 vehicles in 2005 and 35,000 in the following year 2006 is known.

Xinkai claims an annual production capacity of 60,000 units.

Products
Mercedes-Benz Ambulance
Mercedes-Benz Commercial Vehicle
Mercedes-Benz Police Car
Xinkai Century Dragon Extended Version
Xinkai Century Dragon Standard Edition
Xinkai Coach Car
Xinkai Falcon (Xinkai Lieying, 新凯 猎鹰)
Xinkai Fashion Star
Xinkai Victory (Xinkai Kai Sheng, 新凯 凯胜)
Xinkai Light Truck
Xinkai Rui Teng
Xinkai Ruida Pickup (also as the "Autorrad Ruda" in Chile)
Xinkai Single Cabine Pickup
Xinkai Star City

Gallery

References

External links
 

Car manufacturers of China
Chinese brands
Chinese companies established in 1984
Companies based in Hebei
Vehicle manufacturing companies established in 1984
Gaobeidian